Strauss is a crater on Mercury. Its name was adopted by the International Astronomical Union in 2019, after the Strauss family of musicians.

The crater Strauss is located southeast of Stieglitz, and is within Borealis Planitia.

References

Impact craters on Mercury